The Empire State Greys are a professional baseball team in the United States. The Greys are a member of the East Division of the Frontier League, an independent baseball league that is an official MLB Partner League.

The Greys were formed prior to the 2022 Frontier League season, due to the Southern Illinois Miners ceasing operations after the 2021 season, in order to maintain an even number of teams in the Frontier League. The Greys are due to compete as a traveling team, with a roster of players from the Empire Professional Baseball League.

Current roster

See also
 Frontier Greys, a similar team in the Frontier League during 2013–2015
 The Grays, a similar team in the Canadian American Association of Professional Baseball that played on multiple occasions
 Road Warriors (Atlantic League), a similar team that played in the Atlantic League of Professional Baseball on multiple occasions

References

External links 

Frontier League teams
Baseball teams established in 2022
2022 establishments in the United States